The SAO of Herzegovina was a self-proclaimed Serbian Autonomous Oblast within today's Bosnia and Herzegovina. It was proclaimed by the Assembly of the Association of Municipalities of Bosnian Krajina in 1991 and was subsequently included into Republika Srpska. SAO Herzegovina was located in the geographical region of Herzegovina. It was also known as SAO Eastern Herzegovina (SAO Istočna Hercegovina / САО Источна Херцеговина).

History
SAO Herzegovina was formed from the Association of Municipalities (a government in SFRY) known as Assembly of the Communities of East Herzegovina, which was formed on 27 May 1991. The SAO East and Old Herzegovina was established on September 12, 1991. It consisted of East Herzegovina which had a Serb ethnic majority. Its capital was Trebinje.

See also
SAO Romanija
SAO North-Eastern Bosnia
SAO Bosanska Krajina

References

External links
 Map

States and territories disestablished in 1992
States and territories established in 1991
History of Republika Srpska
Separatism in Bosnia and Herzegovina
History of Herzegovina